Chris Pappas may refer to:

Chris Pappas (politician), American politician
Chris Pappas (Neighbours), a fictional character on the television series Neighbours
Chris Pappas (EastEnders), a fictional character on the television series EastEnders
Christopher D. Pappas, CEO of Trinseo
Christopher Pappas (South African politician), South African politician